Richard Earl Blackmore (born August 14, 1956 in Vicksburg, Mississippi) is a former American football defensive back in the National Football League. Blackmore played college football at Mississippi State University. In the NFL, he played five seasons for the Philadelphia Eagles (1979–1982) and the San Francisco 49ers (1983).

1956 births
Living people
Sportspeople from Vicksburg, Mississippi
Players of American football from Mississippi
American football cornerbacks
Mississippi State Bulldogs football players
Philadelphia Eagles players
San Francisco 49ers players